Wendy Repass is an American folk singer-songwriter located in Charlottesville, Virginia.

Artists worked with
Eddie from Ohio, Anton Chenko, producer of Suzanne Vega's "Solitude Standing", Daemon recording artist Kristen Hall, The Marshall Tucker Band, Indigo Girls, and Matthew Sweet, Dave Matthews Band, former US Poet Laureate Rita Dove, John McCutcheon, producer Kevin McNoldy, drummer Stuart Gunter of Clare Quilty, bass by Andy Waldeck of Earth to Andy and violin by former National Symphony Orchestra member Ann Marie Simpson.

Discography
 Chapter 1: The Coming of Age (1995)
 Motherstone (2005)

Awards
"Chapter 1: The Coming of Age" voted the Best Independent CD of 1995 by Music Monthly.

References
 "Wendy Repass: The Coming of Age", Music Monthly, June, Issue #129 Vol.12#6, J. Doug Gill, 1995.
 "Forward Repass", C-ville Weekly, Clubland, Don Harrison, 1995.
 "Repass Amasses Following", The Cavalier Daily, Karen Loew, March 10, 1996.
 "Wendy Repass, Chapter 1: The Coming of Age", 13 Magazine, Keith Schweiert, April 1995.
 "Exuberance Wins on Frosh Album", The Breeze, Jason Corner, March 2, 1995.
 "Wendy Repass—Harmonizing Hope and Anger", Out in Virginia, Greg Tomso, 1995.

Living people
Musicians from Charlottesville, Virginia
Singer-songwriters from Virginia
Year of birth missing (living people)